"Pink Triangle" is a song by American rock band Weezer. As the third and final single from the band's second studio album Pinkerton (1996), it was released to radio on May 20, 1997 by DGC Records. The song was written by Rivers Cuomo.

Background
The song describes a man who falls in love with a woman with whom he imagines he could settle down and be married. However, he soon discovers that the object of his affection is a lesbian who possibly thinks that the man himself is gay. The song is based on a real person that Weezer frontman Rivers Cuomo encountered while a student at Harvard, whom he fantasized a life with until he saw a pink triangle—a gay pride symbol—on her backpack. According to Cuomo, a year and a half after the album was released he discovered that the woman was actually not a lesbian and had just been showing support for the gay community.

A promo single was sent to radio stations that also contained an acoustic version of the song recorded at Shorecrest High School in Seattle, Washington. The song received limited airplay and never charted and thus was deemed not to warrant a video.

In 2004, the band released its first DVD Video Capture Device, which features a video of the Shorecrest performance as well as a video cut by Weezer.com webmaster and longtime friend of the band Karl Koch that features footage shot by Jennifer Wilson, wife of Weezer drummer Patrick Wilson.

Composition
"Pink Triangle" is composed in the key of G♭ Major, with a tempo of 118 beats per minute.

Reception
Mark Beaumont of NME ranked "Pink Triangle" as Weezer's fifth best song. Josh Modell of The A.V. Club considered the song to be "less successful—musically and emotionally" compared to other songs on Pinkerton.

Track listing
Radio Station Promo CD
 "Pink Triangle" (Remix) - 4:02
 "Pink Triangle" (Live Acoustic) - 4:18

Live acoustic track is the same as on "The Good Life" OZ EP

Personnel
This would be the band's last single with Sharp before he left a year later.
Rivers Cuomo – lead vocals, guitar, glockenspiel 
Patrick Wilson – drums, percussion
Brian Bell – rhythm guitar, backing vocals
Matt Sharp – bass guitar, backing vocals
Scott Riebling – bass guitar (remix only)

References

Weezer songs
1996 songs
1997 singles
LGBT-related songs
Songs written by Rivers Cuomo
DGC Records singles